Scorpion is a fictional character in the Mortal Kombat fighting game franchise by Midway Games and NetherRealm Studios. An undead ninja. Debuting in the original 1992 game, Scorpion has appeared in every main installment of the series (including updates) alongside Raiden. He is principally defined by his quest to avenge the deaths of himself, his family, and his clan. His primary weapon is a kunai-rope dart, which he uses to harpoon opponents, while his trademark fatality is the "Fire Breath" in which he removes his mask to reveal a skull right before immolating his opponent.

The character's backstory establishes him as Hanzo Hasashi, a warrior from the fictional Shirai Ryu clan who was killed by the elder Sub-Zero (Bi-Han) of the rival Lin Kuei clan. Subsequent games reveal that his family and clan were murdered by the sorcerer Quan Chi, who becomes Scorpion's primary target for vengeance. Depicted as a neutral party in most games, Scorpion generally forgoes the franchise's main conflicts to pursue his personal missions, which sometimes results in him taking the side that will help his objective. Scorpion is also both a rival and ally of the younger Sub-Zero (Kuai Liang).

Scorpion has received critical acclaim since his debut and frequently appears in media outside of the games. He is regarded as Mortal Kombat most iconic fighter; series co-creator Ed Boon cites Scorpion as his favorite character.

Appearances and character background
In Mortal Kombat (1992), it is established that a series of Mortal Kombat tournaments are being held to determine if the forces of Outworld will be permitted by the Elder Gods to invade and conquer the dimension of Earthrealm. The game takes place during the tenth and final tournament, hosted by the shape-shifter sorcerer Shang Tsung, who is a servant of the Outworld emperor Shao Kahn. In the original game, it is implied Scorpion has enmity towards Sub-Zero due to rivalry between their opposing warrior clans (Scorpion's Japanese clan is unnamed, while the game names Sub-Zero's Chinese clan "Lin Kuei"). Scorpion's ending reveals he is actually an undead specter, a warrior who was killed by Sub-Zero, survived by a wife and child, and allowed to return to the physical realms in order to have his revenge. The same ending implies that the curse of Scorpion's supernatural existence means he can have revenge but cannot reunite with his still-living family. Canonically, after the tenth tournament is won by the human champion Liu Kang, Scorpion kills Sub-Zero.

After the release of the first Mortal Kombat game, players were able to order a special tie-in comic book written and illustrated by MK co-creator John Tobias, published by Midway. The comic explained more of the backstory of the tournament and its characters, though it does not fully fit into the canon of later games in the franchise. In a one-page scene, two years after his death, Scorpion attacks Sub-Zero, who recognizes him and is shocked. Scorpion declares "demons" have allowed him to return and avenge his own demise. Wishing to gain his vengeance through an honorable fight rather than a surprise attack, Scorpion leaves, promising Sub-Zero they will meet again in the tournament. Later games make it unclear how much time passes between Scorpion's death and the tenth Mortal Kombat tournament. The game Mortal Kombat Mythologies: Sub-Zero (1997) shows Sub-Zero joining Mortal Kombat days or weeks after he kills Scorpion, but does not clarify whether he is joining the tenth tournament or one of the tournaments that occurred years earlier, surviving and later deciding to return for the tenth.

In Mortal Kombat II (1993), some time after the tenth tournament, a rematch Mortal Kombat tournament held in the dimension of Outworld, now hosted by Emperor Shao Kahn. Another Lin Kuei warrior with ice abilities called Sub-Zero joins this tournament, with the game's introduction leaving it deliberately vague whether this is a new fighter or the original warrior back from the dead. Scorpion enters the new tournament to investigate this warrior. When Scorpion sees the new Sub-Zero spare the life of an opponent, he realizes this is not the cruel, cold-hearted man who killed him but the man's younger brother. Scorpion decides to be the younger Sub-Zero's guardian in atonement for killing his older brother. The elder Sub-Zero and younger Sub-Zero are later given the birth names of Bi-Han and Kuai Liang, respectively, in the Mortal Kombat reboot game. Mortal Kombat II also introduces the character Noob Saibot, an undead warrior who will later be revealed to be the resurrected Bi-Han.

Scorpion and the game's similar palette-swapped ninja characters were not playable characters in Mortal Kombat 3. Scorpion returned as a playable character in the 1995 upgrade Ultimate Mortal Kombat 3. In the story of Ultimate Mortal Kombat 3, Emperor Shao Kahn enlists Scorpion's aid. Scorpion's allegiance to the emperor dissolves when he discovers this puts him against Sub-Zero, who has allied with Earth's defenders.

The game Mortal Kombat Mythologies: Sub-Zero (1997) featured Scorpion as an unplayable boss character who appears twice. The game's story is a prologue to the original game, expanding on the elder Sub-Zero's backstory, Scorpion's backstory, and introducing the sorcerer Quan Chi. The game established Scorpion's real name and the name of his clan, cemented the Lin Kuei is a Chinese clan and its warriors do not consider themselves ninja, and explained the reason for Lin Kuei warriors and Shirai Ryu warriors wearing such similar costumes. According to the game's story, the Shirai Ryu was originally founded by the ninja Takeda, who served with the Lin Kuei before developing his own form of fighting and deciding to leave the clan. He kept the same basic uniform design for the Shirai Ryu but altered details and coloring.

In the main story of Mortal Kombat Mythologies: Sub-Zero, years before the original game's events, the still living Shirai Ryu ninja Hanzo Hasashi A.K.A. Scorpion is enlisted by the necromancer Quan Chi to find a map hidden in a Shaolin temple. Quan Chi also gives this task to Sub-Zero of the Lin Kuei clan. Hanzo and Bi-Han duel, resulting in Hanzo's death. Sub-Zero delivers the map to Quan Chi, who repays the Lin Kuei clan by eliminating all members of the rival Shirai Ryu clan, including Scorpion's wife Harumi and his son Satoshi. The Lin Kuei Grandmaster applauds this action. Sub-Zero takes another assignment for Quan Chi, retrieving an amulet that, unknown to him, is the power source of Shinnok, the fallen Elder God who ruled the Netherrealm. Taking the amulet, Quan Chi leaves to the Netherrealm, but returns a fake to Shinnok, keeping the real amulet for himself. Afterward, the thunder god Raiden confronts Sub-Zero, holding him responsible for giving Quan Chi power a mortal is not meant to possess. To fix the situation, Raiden sends Sub-Zero to the Netherrealm where he meets Scorpion again, who is now a fiery specter. After defeating Hanzo's spirit, Sub-Zero eventually finds and defeats Shinnok, retrieving the fraudulent amulet and bringing it to Raiden. Returning to the Lin Kuei stronghold, Sub-Zero is told by the Grandmaster of his clan that his next task is to participate in the Mortal Kombat contest as one of several champions fighting for the sorcerer Shang Tsung. Despite this meaning he would be fighting against the forces of Earthrealm, the elder Sub-Zero agrees. This leads into the events of the first game.

Mortal Kombat 4 (1997) reveals the necromancer Quan Chi survived the events of MK Mythologies: Sub-Zero. To help with Shinnok's invasion of the realms, Quan Chi releases Scorpion from the Netherrealm once more. The necromancer offers Scorpion a full resurrection as a living man, permanently free from the Netherrealm, if he kills the younger Sub-Zero. If the player reaches Sub-Zero's victory ending, Quan Chi reveals he is personally responsible for the death of the Shirai Ryu clan. Scorpion and Sub-Zero then attack simultaneously, killing the sorcerer before parting ways peacefully. In Scorpion's victory ending, which is considered canonical and leads into the next game, he defeats the younger Sub-Zero. Quan Chi suddenly appears and boasts of his involvement in killing Scorpion's clan and family. The necromancer then attempts to banish Scorpion to the Netherrealm permanently, but the ninja grabs him, sending them both into the Hellish realm.

Scorpion's MK4 ending is carried over into Mortal Kombat: Deadly Alliance (2002). In this game, Quan Chi escapes Scorpion and hires the Oni Drahmin and Moloch to protect him. In a non-canonical ending, Scorpion is killed when Drahmin and Moloch hurl him into a "Soulnado", a magical tornado consisting of tormented souls trapped between Earthrealm and Outworld. In Mortal Kombat: Deception, Scorpion is depicted as having escaped the Netherrealm. The game's events lead Scorpion to accept a new role as the Elder Gods' servant, working as a protector of Earthrealm by helping prevent the merging of the realms by the villain Onaga.

In the 2005 beat 'em up spin-off Mortal Kombat: Shaolin Monks, set during the events of Mortal Kombat II, Scorpion is a boss character who attempts to kill the game's playable protagonists Liu Kang and Kung Lao.

In the Konquest mode of Mortal Kombat: Armageddon (2006), Scorpion cuts a deal with the Elder Gods, offering to serve them in exchange for the resurrection of the Shirai Ryu, as well as his wife and son. Scorpion's clan and family are resurrected, but only as undead beings. Enraged, Scorpion seeks to destroy the Elder Gods' chance of preventing Armageddon by taking the elemental Blaze's power, but the Edenian demigod Taven defeats him. Scorpion is later killed by Sub-Zero in a battle royal amongst the series characters.

Scorpion appears in the 2008 crossover title Mortal Kombat vs. DC Universe, participating in a war between the two titular franchises. In his ending, the essence of Dark Kahn finds a host in Scorpion's body, making him the most powerful being in the universe.

Reboot continuity 
Starting with the Mortal Kombat reboot game (2011), an alternative-timeline is created by revising certain events of the franchise's first three games. When the reboot game introduces Scorpion, he is once again newly joining the tenth Mortal Kombat tournament. It is now established that Quan Chi was responsible for his original resurrection and not just his return in MK4. Quan Chi grants Scorpion his enhanced supernatural abilities and encourages him to kill their mutual enemy Bi-Han, though he keeps his own involvement in destroying the Shirai Ryu clan a secret. Attempting to alter the timeline in hopes of averting the path that eventually leads to Armageddon, Raiden convinces Scorpion to spare Bi-Han's life in exchange for the Elder Gods resurrecting the Shirai Ryu clan. Scorpion initially honors the deal, defeating but not killing Bi-Han before the tournament is completed, but Quan Chi provokes Scorpion into going back on his promise by showing him a vision of Sub-Zero and the Lin Kuei murdering his family and clan. Despite Bi-Han denying his involvement, Scorpion incinerates him and returns to the tournament grounds holding Sub-Zero's skull and spinal column. This leads Kuai Liang, who at the time calls himself "Tundra," to adopt the Sub-Zero mantle somewhat earlier than he did in the original timeline. The younger Sub-Zero later defeats Scorpion, but is prevented from destroying the undead warrior when his Lin Kuei comrades apprehend him on order by the clan's Grandmaster. Against his will, the younger Sub-Zero is then turned into a cyborg.

In Scorpion's non-canonical arcade ending to the Mortal Kombat reboot game, the spirits of the Shirai Ryu later appear before Scorpion and reveal the truth about their murder, then aid in killing Quan Chi. In Sub-Zero's non-canonical ending, he learns Quan Chi killed the Shirai Ryu as payment for the Lin Kuei's services. He reveals this information to Scorpion and they form their own "deadly alliance."

In Mortal Kombat X, which takes place two years after the previous game, Scorpion still serves Quan Chi. The necromancer has also restored Kuai Liang to human form, making him an undead warrior like Scorpion rather than leaving him a cyborg. Raiden and his allies later restore the two warriors to full life, freeing them from the necromancer's influence. Over the course of the next two decades, the restored Hanzo Hasashi reforms the Shirai Ryu, making a new clan dedicated to the protection of Earth, and trains Takeda Takahashi, son of his ally and fellow warrior Kenshi. When Sub-Zero reveals proof Quan Chi was responsible for the destruction of the Shirai Ryu clan, while also acknowledging the Lin Kuei's role in the act and their history of dishonor, Scorpion finally accepts Kuai Liang as an ally. When the Special Forces capture Quan Chi, a revenge-driven Hanzo attacks them and releases the sorcerer so they can fight. Scorpion then decapitates Quan Chi, but not before the necromancer finishes reciting a spell that frees Shinnok, the fallen Elder God.

In Mortal Kombat 11, two years after MKX and Shinnok's defeat, Hanzo continues to lead the Shirai Ryu as its Grandmaster. When the keeper of time Kronika attempts to erase Raiden from history, she brings a past version of the undead Scorpion to the present, recruiting him by promising to resurrect his clan and family. Meanwhile, the present-day Hanzo works with Sub-Zero to foil the Lin Kuei assassin turned cyborg called Sektor and his plans to build a Cyber Lin Kuei army for Kronika. They are successful and learn Sektor also played a role in murdering Scorpion's clan and family. After Kronika's forces compromise or destroy most of the bases of Earthrealm's defenders, Scorpion succeeds in recruiting Kharon, ferryman of the dead, and convinces his younger self to turn away from Kronika. He is then killed by the Outworld villain D'Vorah. Dying, Scorpion urges his younger self to abandon vengeance and defend Earthrealm. The younger Scorpion promises to do so, joining the allied forces of Earthrealm and Outworld to stop Kronika. In his non-canonical arcade ending, the younger Scorpion kills Kronika so he can restart history and ensure his loved ones' survival. When he discovers that otherworldly forces conspire to make sure the tragedy always occurs, he embarks on a new quest for revenge.

Other games
Scorpion appeared as a guest character in Midway's non-fighting titles NBA Jam Tournament Edition (1995), The Grid (2000), MLB Slugfest: Loaded (2004), and Psi-Ops: The Mindgate Conspiracy (2004).

Scorpion joined the cast of 2013's Injustice: Gods Among Us as a downloadable character. In his single-player battle ending, wondering how he ended up in this world, Scorpion confronted the demon Trigon, who summoned him out of anger that he had left his demon army and robbed him the glory of defeating the One-Earth High Councilor (Superman). Scorpion fights and defeats Trigon before taking command of his demonic forces, which he plans to use to rule the world.

Character design and gameplay 

Scorpion appeared in the first Mortal Kombat as one of three palette-swapped ninja characters along with Sub-Zero and Reptile. His early origins were revealed by the series' original chief character designer John Tobias in September 2011 when he posted several pages of old pre-production character sketches and notes on Twitter. Scorpion and Sub-Zero were simply described as "[a] palette swap for 2 ninjas—a hunter and the hunted," while Tobias also considered the concepts of either one of them fleeing their clan, or a "revenge story" involving the then-unnamed characters being part of rival clans. In regards to the game's strict memory limitations, co-creator and programmer Ed Boon recalled: "A lot of attention went into the economics of it, and so we knew that if we could take a character and change their color and use basically the same memory to create two characters, we'd save a lot of money and we'd have two characters."

Scorpion was given a yellow palette because the developers decided it symbolized fire in contrast to Sub-Zero's ice blue. Their similar appearance but opposite nature "prompted the story behind them being these opposing ninja-clan-type characters." A third ninja swap, Reptile, was added in the third revision as a hidden non-playable character who was outfitted in green and used Scorpion's spear (along with Sub-Zero's freeze) as part of his offensive arsenal; he was devised by Boon as "a cooler version of Scorpion." The original costume was created from a modified ninja-like outfit bought at a Chicago costume shop and was red for filming in the first game, but a different yellow one with a quilted vest and knee-high shin guards was utilized for Mortal Kombat II. This in turn made the other male ninja characters therein—Sub-Zero, Reptile, and hidden characters Smoke and Noob Saibot—palette swaps of Scorpion, with the latter two also using Scorpion's spear when players fought them separately in secret battles. Scorpion and the ninja characters were first played by Daniel Pesina, who was replaced by John Turk for Ultimate Mortal Kombat 3 and the 1996 compilation Mortal Kombat Trilogy, while Sal Divita played the character in MK: Mythologies.

While his ninja-outfit template from the first generation of games has remained relatively unchanged over time, the improved graphics of the post-Mortal Kombat 4 three-dimensional releases have allowed more details to better differentiate the male ninja characters, and Scorpion's costumes were duly enhanced with objects such as two katana swords strapped to his back and his spear attached to a rope tied to his belt in Deadly Alliance, and a set of ornate shoulder epaulets in Deception, in which his alternate costume was a throwback to the two-dimensional MK titles. Scorpion's MK2011 costume was inspired by his namesake, such as the character's abdomen-shaped shoulder pads, the two stinger-handled swords crisscrossed on his back, and the exoskeletal pattern on his hard-shell face mask. Scorpion was included with Sub-Zero, Reptile and Ermac in a bundle of classic costumes from the first Mortal Kombat that was released as downloadable content for the 2011 reboot. For Injustice: Gods Among Us, he received a new costume designed by comic artist Jim Lee. In the original Mortal Kombats fighter-selection screen, Scorpion had regular human eyes, as his identity as a resurrected specter was meant to be a mystery, but he was given solid yellow or white eyes for every release thereafter starting with MKII, while actors portraying Scorpion in live-action media such as the feature films and the Mortal Kombat: Legacy web series were outfitted with opaque contact lenses in order to achieve this effect.

Scorpion yells one of two taunts — "Get over here!" and "Come here!" — at his opponents when he hits them with his spear. They were voiced by Boon in the games and both feature films, but only one of them ("Come here!") was included in the home ports of MK and MKII due to memory constraints. According to Boon, the second of the character's phrases originated because he thought "it would be funny to have him yell out 'Get over here!' when he [threw the spear]," and he was thus encouraged to get behind the studio microphone and record the taunts. As confirmed by Daniel Pesina, that phrase was originally an idea of Kano's actor Richard Divizio, as was Scorpion's skull face, inspired by the classic film Jason and the Argonauts. Twenty years after the first MK game's release, Boon included creating the spear move as well as the character itself among his personal high points of the franchise's history, adding: "I remember people sitting in my office all day just doing this uppercut [on a speared enemy] again and again, like 'Oh my God, that feels so good.' It just became the cornerstone of [the game]." MKII saw the debut of the phrase "Toasty!", which was voiced by series sound designer Dan Forden during a variation of Scorpion's "Flaming Skull" Fatality or at random when any of the game's characters landed an uppercut. According to Tobias, it first originated as "You're Toast!", which was a taunt bandied among the designers during game-testing sessions.

Scorpion's signature special move throughout the series has him hurling a harpoon-like spear (described as a kunai) attached to a length of rope at his opponents. The spear impales his opponents through the chest before Scorpion then pulls them in to close range for a free hit. This move was designed by Pesina, who did not like the original lasso move as it reminded him of that of Wonder Woman, and inspired by the ancient Asian weapons known as a rope dart. His other incumbent special move throughout the series, save for Deadly Alliance, has been his Teleport Punch, where he flies offscreen during battle and then reappears to strike his opponent from behind. Scorpion additionally gained a new leg-takedown maneuver in MKII that was not well-received (Sega Saturn Magazine called it a "ridiculous" move that "no one ever used"). He was considered a lower-tier character by GamePro in their 1993 MKII character rankings, rating him eighth out of the game's twelve playables and describing both him and Sub-Zero as "formerly a top-tier character [who] doesn't have much of a chance in MKII since all of the male ninjas have some poor matchups," with Scorpion faring the worst against Jax and Mileena. Ed Lomas of Sega Saturn Magazine described the character as having "simple yet effective" special moves in UMK3 that "make him good for beginners, [which] doesn't stop him from being a useful character," while his "trusty" spear was "perfect for setting up combos." GameSpy, in their Deception walkthrough, described the character as "a well-rounded character that has strengths in combos as well as in special and normal moves." They additionally described the spear as "useful as ever" in Armageddon, adding, "Between [that and his] other special moves ... Scorpion pretty much has everything covered." Prima Games' MK2011 strategy guide considered Scorpion to be well-balanced with no distinct weaknesses or advantages, while winning more than half of his fights against the game's other characters. He is also a playable character for both the versus and story modes in Shaolin Monks, where his move sets in this game are largely identical to Liu Kang's with some original techniques.

Scorpion's signature finishing move from the original game up until Mortal Kombat 4 was his "Fire Breath" Fatality, in which he removes his mask to reveal a skull right before immolating his opponent. A variation of this finisher was included in MKII: entering a different button/joystick combination added the spoken "Toasty!" phrase that simultaneously appeared on the screen. While the "Fire Breath" was brought back for Mortal Kombat vs. DC Universe in 2008, his spear has otherwise served as his primary tool in his Fatalities in the three-dimensional games, from impaling his opponents through the head and then decapitating them in Deadly Alliance, using it to yank off their limbs in Deception, and plunging it into their chest before kicking them through a portal that left nothing but a skinned corpse hanging from the spear's chain in MK2011 ("Nether Gate"). His second Fatality in the reboot, "Split Decision", had Scorpion using one of his back-mounted swords to hack his opponent to pieces.

Scorpion would indirectly play a role in the fabrication of the-then nonexistent character Ermac when Electronic Gaming Monthly published a doctored screenshot of Scorpion from the original game in 1993. This subsequently spawned false player rumors of a glitch that would turn Scorpion's sprite red with the name "Error Macro" appearing in the energy bar. Ermac became playable in UMK3, in which he was a red palette swap of Scorpion who shared his Teleport Punch.

Other media

Literature
Scorpion has a supporting role in Jeff Rovin's 1995 non-canon novel Mortal Kombat, which is set before the events of the first game. He is depicted as a young man who gains his special powers after the soul of his deceased father merges with his body so it can be used as a vessel to seek revenge against Sub-Zero for his murder.

In Malibu Comics' Mortal Kombat miniseries "Blood and Thunder" (1994), Scorpion is simply a specter consumed by revenge against Sub-Zero, while his spear is changed to a spiked morning star attached to a length of chain or rope. Along with the main characters from the first game, he seeks to solve all the riddles inside Shang Tsung's mystical tome, the "Tao Te Zhan", in order to gain absolute power (which no one accomplishes). In the followup Battlewave miniseries (1995), Scorpion is returned to the living world by Outworld emperor Shao Kahn with a mystical gem called the Deathstone, and is put in command of an army of undead soldiers.

Scorpion plays a minor part in several issues of DC Comics' 2015 miniseries Mortal Kombat X: Blood Ties, set before the events of the game.

Film and television

Scorpion was played in a minor role by Chris Casamassa in the film Mortal Kombat (1995). The plot has him and Sub-Zero serving as slaves under Shang Tsung's command. He is killed by Johnny Cage in the Mortal Kombat tournament. Scorpion's spear is a living snake-like creature that shoots from a slit in his palm and has a limited range of flight. In the sequel Mortal Kombat: Annihilation (1997), Scorpion (played by J. J. Perry) again works for a higher power, this time Shao Kahn. Following a failed assassination attempt on Liu Kang and Kitana by Kahn's extermination squads due to the interference of the younger Sub-Zero, Scorpion suddenly appears and incapacitates Sub-Zero. He then kidnaps Kitana and is never seen again. 

In the 1995 animated film Mortal Kombat: The Journey Begins, Scorpion is again depicted as a henchman to Shang Tsung opposite Sub-Zero, and their past connection is explored during the course of the film in a narrated computer-animated fight sequence.

Scorpion made one appearance in one episode of the 1996 animated series Mortal Kombat: Defenders of the Realm His rivalry with Sub-Zero is vaguely explored as no explicit mention is ever made of Sub-Zero having killed him. Scorpion instead serves as an independent entity of evil, while his spear was depicted as a green snake-like head attached to a length of chain.

In the 1998 television series Mortal Kombat: Conquest, Scorpion (Chris Casamassa) commands his lover, Peron, to murder Sub-Zero's sister, and Sub-Zero kills Peron in retaliation, which culminates in a duel which ends in a stalemate due to the arrival of the show's main characters Kung Lao, Siro, and Taja.

In the 2010 live-action short film Mortal Kombat: Rebirth, directed by Kevin Tancharoen, Scorpion (Ian Anthony Dale)  is addressed by his real name and is a voluntary prisoner being questioned by Deacon City police captain Jackson Briggs regarding an underground tournament hosted by Shang Tsung.

 Dale reprised the role in Tancharoen's Mortal Kombat: Legacy web series. His story takes place in feudal Japan, when Hasashi is the leader of the Shirai Ryu and a family man training his young son, Jubei, in combat. Hanzo is later summoned to a meeting with the shogun that turns out to be a ruse by Bi-Han (Sub-Zero) of the rival Lin Kuei clan. After subduing Sub-Zero in battle, he returns to his village to find his family slain before he himself is killed from behind by Sub-Zero. Quan Chi resurrects Scorpion as a specter and promises him revenge against Sub-Zero in exchange for his services. The dialogue of Scorpion, his family, and Sub-Zero is in Japanese with English subtitles. In the 2013 second season, a flashback reveals that Hanzo and Bi-Han were childhood friends but driven apart by the mutual disdain of their clans. Two decades later, both clans have made some effort towards reconciliation, but Hasashi encounters Bi-Han's younger brother, Kuai Liang, who provokes a fight but is killed by Hanzo offscreen. Hanzo and Bi-Han attempt to maintain the truce between their clans with no repercussions against the Shirai Ryu for Kuai's death, but after the events of season one, the resurrected Hanzo (now Scorpion) is wrongly convinced of Bi-Han's culpability in his family's and clan's deaths. In the present day, Bi-Han and Scorpion fight in the Mortal Kombat tournament, and Scorpion kills Bi-Han.

Scorpion is the titular protagonist of the animated film Mortal Kombat Legends: Scorpion's Revenge. The film follows the basic contours of the first game's storyline, as well as Scorpion's origins and past life as Hanzo Hasashi and the murder of his family and clan by Sub-Zero (Quan Chi in disguise) and the Lin Kuei. He is shown to more explicitly aid the Earthrealm warriors in the Mortal Kombat tournament before achieving his goal of avenging his family and clan by killing Quan Chi in combat. He chooses to remain on the island, and dies as it is destroyed. Scorpion returns in the sequel Mortal Kombat Legends: Battle of the Realms.

Hiroyuki Sanada plays Scorpion in the reboot film Mortal Kombat (2021). With his wife, eldest child, and clan murdered at the hands of the Lin Kuei clan and their leader Bi-Han, Hanzo Hasashi seeks revenge. After swearing revenge and killing a number of Lin Kuei assassins, he is killed by Bi-Han as well. A vengeful spectre banished to the Netherrealm, Hasashi returns as Scorpion centuries later to fight Bi-Han, now as Sub-Zero, next to Cole Young, the descendant of Hasashi's surviving child. Sanada was not familiar with the Mortal Kombat franchise prior to the film's development, but researched the character, whom he called "a very tasty role for an actor: family man changed to fighting machine."

Merchandise and promotion
Along with the original series characters, Scorpion was highlighted on an individual track from The Immortals' album Mortal Kombat: The Album (1994), titled "Lost Soul Bent on Revenge".

Scorpion has featured in various types of merchandise during his tenure in the MK series, mostly action figures and sculptures. Hasbro released the first Scorpion figures in 1994: a 3.75" version in which his mask was blue and he was packaged with a plastic scorpion accessory, then a twelve-inch figure whose design and packaged weaponry were more in line with the games. Toy Island distributed a Scorpion figure in 1996 as part of their MK Trilogy collection, which included a pair of hookswords, and Infinite Concepts put out a Scorpion figure in 1999. Jazwares released a 6" Deception figure in 2005, and a 2006 Shaolin Monks figure that was also included as part of a Hot Topic-exclusive two-pack with Sub-Zero, in addition to a collection of figures in 2011: a 4" figure from their MK2011 line, a "Klassic" four-incher, and a "Retro" figure that featured an interchangeable skull head and which was packaged with Sub-Zero, Reptile and Smoke in a box set. Syco Collectibles released a host of Scorpion merchandise in 2011-2012: 10" (with glow-in-the-dark eyes) and 18" polystone statues, along with two busts—a 1:2 scale with a 15" base and light-up eyes; and a smaller bust with an 11" base that featured a detachable head. Pop Culture Shock distributed a life-sized bust in 2011 that featured removable shoulder pads and light-up eyes, as well as a 19" statuette based on his UMK3 design as part of their "Mortal Kombat Klassics" collection. A 16.5" mixed-media statue was released by the company in 2012, in which Scorpion was sculpted in a spear-throwing pose and was outfitted in all black.

Scorpion was one of thirteen MK2011 characters depicted on life-sized standing cardboard cutouts from Advanced Graphics. Funko released a Scorpion bobblehead in 2011, and he was one of twenty characters featured on 2.5" x 3.5" collectible magnets by Ata-Boy Wholesale that year. He appeared along with other Mortal Kombat series villains Kabal, Quan Chi, and Shao Kahn in a collection of 2.5" super-deformed figures released by Jazwares in 2012.

Reception and legacy

Cultural impact
Scorpion has made several cameo appearances in television programs, such as Drawn Together, Robot Chicken, and The Cleveland Show. The character was featured along with Raiden, Ermac, Jax, and Shang Tsung in a 2014 animated short film produced by Comedy Central that parodied the Mortal Kombat games.

Critical reception and popularity
Scorpion, along with Sub-Zero, is often regarded as one of the most popular and iconic characters in the Mortal Kombat franchise, and in the fighting-game genre in general. Game Informer rated Scorpion the third best fighting game character in 2009, while UGO Networks ranked Scorpion second only to the series' main protagonist Liu Kang in their 2012 list of the top characters in the franchise. PLAY magazine ranked him fourth on their list of top ninja characters in 2013. Lucas Sullivan of GamesRadar, in 2012, ranked him as the seventh best fighting game character in the genre's history due to the "coolness of his 'undead antagonist' factor. Despite the fact that he started out as a mere palette swap, Scorpion's appeal made him a frontrunner in every major MK game to date." Complex featured Scorpion in a whole host of best-of lists: he was ranked the fifth-most brutal fighter in the series and the 15th best video game mascot, in addition to Complex naming him the fourth-"most dominant" fighting game character in 2012.

As Scorpion is regularly intertwined with Sub-Zero throughout the series, they have often been paired together in regards to critical reception. Sharing the fifth spot on the top video-game ninja list by PC World in 2009. He tied with Sub-Zero at the top of Game Revolution's 2006 list of the top ten "old school" MK characters, and a 2011 GamesRadar article discussed their evolution across the Mortal Kombat series, citing them as its two most popular characters. Together, Scorpion and Sub-Zero were voted the fifth most iconic characters in the two-decade history of the PlayStation by readers of PlayStation Official Magazine – UK in 2015. GamePro ranked Scorpion, Sub-Zero, and the other ninjas from the series third in their 2009 list of the best palette-swapped video game characters, adding that Midway Games "has turned the art of making new characters from other, different-colored characters into a science."

Special moves and Fatalities have been mostly very well received. In 2010, IGN listed Scorpion's "Flaming Skull" as the second best MK Fatality without specifying any particular title in the series, due to how the player's perception of the character changes when he removes his mask. They called it an "enduring classic", noting that the finisher was notably unchanged in future games as a result of its connection with the character. His spear attack was ranked ninth in GameSpot's 2002 list of the top ten fighting-game special moves of all time as the single most powerful yet balanced attack in the original game, as well as for its initial shock value, furthermore deeming it "the definitive Mortal Kombat move." The "Nether Gate" from MK2011 was included by FHM on their list of the game's nine most brutal Fatalities. His MKII Friendship, shared with Sub-Zero and Reptile, placed in Prima Games' 2014 list of the series' top 50 Fatalities, in addition to the "Nether Gate", his stage Fatality from MK2011, and the "Flaming Skull" from the original MK. Paste rated it the fourth best Fatality from MK2011, in addition to rating the "Flaming Skull" as the third best finisher from the first game. However, his Animality from UMK3/Trilogy (a penguin that lays an exploding egg) tied with that of Rain as the eighth worst finisher in the series according to GamePro.

Scorpion's catchphrase "Get over here!" was listed in PLAYs joke list of ten best chat-up lines. According to PlayStation Universe in 2011, Scorpion "has spawned one of the most iconic catchphrases in gaming history" and "remains a firm fan favorite nineteen years since his debut."

See also

Ninja in popular culture

References

External links

Action film characters
Action film villains
Fictional Japanese people in video games
Fictional Ninjutsu practitioners
Fictional Piguaquan practitioners
Fictional assassins in video games
Fictional blade and dart throwers
Fictional characters from Kansai
Fictional characters with immortality
Fictional characters with post-traumatic stress disorder
Fictional chain fighters
Fictional rope fighters
Fictional hapkido practitioners
Fictional kenjutsuka
Fictional male martial artists
Fictional martial artists in video games
Fictional mass murderers
Fictional mercenaries in video games
Fictional murderers
Fictional polearm and spearfighters
Fictional skeletons
Male characters in video games
Male video game villains
Mortal Kombat characters
Ninja characters in video games
Video game antagonists
Video game bosses
Male film villains
Video game characters introduced in 1992
Video game characters who can teleport
Video game characters with fire or heat abilities
Video game mascots
Video game protagonists
Vigilante characters in video games
Zombie and revenant characters in video games